Willington is a suburb of Maidstone, in the Maidstone district, in the county of Kent, England.

References

Villages in Kent
Maidstone